This article provides details of international football games played by the El Salvador national football team from 2020 to present.

Results

2020

2021

2022

Forthcoming fixtures
The following matches are scheduled:

Head to head records

Notes

References

El Salvador national football team